STEM Academy or S.T.E.M. Academy, a school for science, technology, engineering and mathematics, may refer to:

Bluford Drew Jemison STEM Academy West, a Middle/High School at Walbrook High School in Baltimore, Maryland
Downingtown STEM Academy, a magnet high school in Downingtown, Pennsylvania
Knox County STEM Academy, a magnet high school in Knoxville, Tennessee
 STEM Academy at A. L. Brown High School in Kannapolis, North Carolina
 STEM Academy at Cypress Creek High School (Harris County, Texas)
 STEM Academy at Franklin High School (Elk Grove, California)
 STEM Academy at University High School (Orange City) in Orange City, Florida
 STEM Academy at Ponitz Career Technology Center in Dayton, Ohio
 STEM Academy at Robert E. Lee High School (San Antonio, Texas)
 STEM Academy at Comstock Public School District in Kalamazoo, Michigan
 Tesla STEM High School, a magnet school in Redmond, Washington
 STEM Magnet Academy at Chicago Public Schools in Chicago, Illinois
 S.T.E.M. Academy at Liverpool High School in Liverpool, New York
 S.T.E.M. Academy at Stony Point High School in Round Rock, Texas
 STEMS Academy at Springfield High School (Springfield, Ohio)
 Phoenix STEM Academy at Dalton L. McMichael High School in Mayodan, North Carolina
 A-STEM Academy at Pemberton Township High School in Pemberton, New Jersey 
 T-STEM Academy at Humble High School in Humble, Texas
 STEM Academy at Great Mills High School in Great Mills, Maryland